Félix Suárez may refer to:
 Félix Suárez Colomo (born 1950), Spanish cyclist
 Félix Suárez (poet) (born 1961), Mexican poet, essayist and editor